Çiçəkli (literally "with flowers" or "place with flowers") is an Azerbaijani place name and may refer to:

 Çiçəkli, Gədəbəy, formerly known as Arabachy
 Çiçəkli, Sabirabad